Guhar Moti is situated near Narayan Sarovar, in Kutch district in Gujarat.

The village comes under the administration of the Narayan Sarovar panchayat.

See also 
 List of extreme points of India

References

External links 
  Rajiv Gandhi Grameen Vidyutikaran Yojana (RGGVY) report

Villages in Kutch district